is an update to the Elevator Action video game.  The game consist of the old and new game modes. The old mode is based on the arcade game.

In new mode, player can choose between 3 characters (Robin, Berry, Fan) like Elevator Action EX, but bullet and grenades are now limited, and are counted as separate inventories. In addition, each stage has time limits. New items include sunglasses, bullet, watch, hamburger. There are 8 buildings in 1 player mode. In 2 player mode, players can play cooperatively or against each other.

4th character (隠丸) can be unlocked in new mode by completing new mode with all 3 characters. This character has faster movement than others, can fall for 1 whole floor without taking damage, but it cannot gain or use automatic weapon, and has maximum 1 life point at the beginning of a building.

External links
MediaKite page

2002 video games
Game Boy Advance games
Game Boy Advance-only games
Japan-exclusive video games
Video games developed in Japan
Works set in elevators